Baotou Tomorrow Technology Co., Ltd. known also as Tomorrow Technology or BTTT is a Chinese listed company based in Baotou, Inner Mongolia. Tomorrow Technology is an associate company of Tomorrow Holding, a company related to Xiao Jianhua.

History
Baotou Yellow River Chemical Industry Co., Ltd. was incorporated on 26 June 1997 as a subsidiary of state-owned enterprise Baotou Chemical Industry Group Corporation. The company became a listed company in the same year, with the parent company still owned 57.53% shares as at 31 December 1999.

Due to the change of ownership of the holding company, Yellow River Chemical Industry also renamed to Baotou Tomorrow Technology Co., Ltd. on 3 September 1999. On 15 April that year Xiao Jianhua also became the new director and chairman of the listed company. Xiao Jianhua step down as the chairman on 27 December 2000 and resigned as a director on 10 April 2001. Baotou Beida Tomorrow Resources Technology owned 22.09% shares of Tomorrow Technology at the end of year 2002. According to a publication of Tsinghua University Press, Baotou Beipu Industry was in fact 100% owned by Beijing Beida Tomorrow Resources Technology at that time. Yellow River Chemical Industry also sold a subsidiary to Beijing Beida Tomorrow Resources Technology  on 23 December 1998.

It also made Baotou Beipu Industry became the largest shareholder for 16.64% shares. It also revealed that Beijing Beida Tomorrow Resources Technology (changed the name to ) was changed to own by Yang Hongmei for 79%, in turn Beijing Keyu Hengxin owned Baotou Beipu Industry for 85% stake at that time.

In January 2007 Tomorrow Holding (a company 17% owned by Xiao Weihua, cousin of Xiao Jianhua), acquired 95% stake of Baotou Beipu Industry (10% from Dalian Tongyi Xinda Technology), making Tomorrow Holding the indirect major shareholder of Tomorrow Technology for 10.32% shares.

The rest of the stake was acquired by Taishan Energy, at that time a subsidiary of Shanghai Ace Co., Ltd.'s, but Tomorrow Technology also owned 34% stake. In 2010, Tomorrow Technology contributed  to Ronglian Investment as capital increase.

In September–October 2008 Zhengyuan Investment acquired most of the shares of Tomorrow Technology held by Zhejiang Hengji Industry and Tomorrow Holding (via Baotou Beipu Industry). At 31 December 2008, Zhengyuan Investment owned 15% shares, followed by Baotou Beida Tomorrow Resources Technology for 7.46% and Zhejiang Hengji Industry for 1.24%; Baotou Beipu Industry owned just 0.32% as the 7th largest shareholder.

( per share).

In June 2012, the major shareholder of Zhengyuan Investment had changed to Tomorrow Holding (36%), making Tomorrow Holding became the indirect major shareholder of Tomorrow Technology again.

In 2016 Tomorrow Technology planned to sell their minority stake (34%) on Taishan Energy to Tiāntiān kējì, the largest shareholder of U9 Game (formerly known as Shanghai Ace) and an associate company of Tomorrow Holding.

Shareholders

Zhengyuan Investment
, the largest shareholder of Tomorrow Technology was Zhèngyuán Tóuzī for 34.60%; Zhengyuan Investment itself was majority owned by Tomorrow Holding for 36%; Tomorrow Holding itself was chaired and majority owned (29%) by Xiao Weihua, cousin of Xiao Jianhua. It was reported that Baotou Beipu Industry, a subsidiary (95%) of Tomorrow Holding, still owned 0.25% stake of Tomorrow Technology, making the consortium of Tomorrow Holding owned 34.85% stake of the public company since 2015. Xiao Weihua owned 5% stake of Baotou Beipu Industry personally. Zhengyuan Investment subscribed the capital increase of the listed company, making the shares they held was increased from 15% to 34.60%.

Zhengyuan Investment was majority (30%) owned by an indirect subsidiary (90% times 99.99% stake) of Beijing Beida Jade Bird from 2008 until 2012. Thus, if excluding minority interests, Peking University only owned about 5.96% indirectly on Tomorrow Technology. The ownership also made Beida Jade Bird Universal Sci-Tech becoming the sister company of Tomorrow Technology, as they both controlled by Jade Bird Software, as well as making Cinda Real Estate as related parties, as Zhengyuan Investment owned 6.56% shares as the third largest shareholder. Before Zhengyuan Investment acquired the shares of Tomorrow Technology, Xishui Strong Year already a related parties of Tomorrow Technology, as Tomorrow Holding were the largest shareholders of both companies. In 2008 Zhengyuan Investment also acquired the shares of Xishui Strong Year (14.608%) from Tomorrow Holding.

In turn, the acquisition made Tomorrow Holding the indirect major shareholder of Tomorrow Technology for 15%.

Circa 2012 or 2013, Beijing Beida Jade Bird sold all their 30% stake on Zhengyuan Investment to parties other than Tomorrow Holding.

Baotou Beida Tomorrow Resources Technology
The second largest shareholder of Tomorrow Technology was Baotou Beida Tomorrow Resources Technology for 3.43% stake, the parent company of Tomorrow Technology from 1997 to 1999. As at 31 December 2015, State-owned Assets Supervision and Administration Commission of Baotou Municipal People's Government owned 53% stake in Baotou Beida Tomorrow Resources Technology, with the rest owned by the company formerly known as Beijing Beida Tomorrow Resources Technology (now known as "Beijing Keyu Hengxin Technology"), a private company owned by Zhang Haixia and Zhou Wuyun.

The chairman of Baotou Beida Tomorrow Resources Technology was Li Jingbo, which was also nominated as the vice-chairman of Baotou Tomorrow Technology.

References

External links
   

Chinese companies established in 1997
Companies based in Baotou
Companies listed on the Shanghai Stock Exchange
Civilian-run enterprises of China
Privatization in China